"Waltzing Matilda" is an 1895 Australian bush ballad written by Banjo Paterson.

Waltzing Matilda may also refer to:

Waltzing Matilda (1933 film), a 1933 Australian film
Waltzing Matilda (1958 film), a 1958 Australian film
Waltzing Matilda (album), a 2008 album by André Rieu and Mirusia
"Tom Traubert's Blues", a 1976 song by Tom Waits sometimes referred to as "Waltzing Matilda"
"Tom Traubert's Blues (Waltzing Matilda)", a 1992 cover version by Rod Stewart
"And the Band Played Waltzing Matilda", a 1971 song by Eric Bogle
 Waltzing Matilda, a section of the song "Street Hassle" by Lou Reed